The National Amateur Cup is an American soccer competition open to all amateur teams affiliated with the United States Soccer Federation (USSF).

The 1948 National Amateur Cup had a grand total of 166 entries. Fall River Ponta Delgada emerged victorious for the third straight year and fourth overall. This year they defeated the Curry Vets of Broughton, Pennsylvania 4–1 in the championship game.

Eastern Division

Western Division

Final

See also
1948 National Challenge Cup

Nat
National Amateur Cup